The 280's decade ran from January 1, 280, to December 31, 289.

Significant people

References